The Wild Dog Destruction Board is an Australian agency of the Government of New South Wales, responsible for the management and maintenance of New South Wales’ section of the Dingo Fence.

The Wild Dog Destruction Board manages the Dingo Fence that runs along the New South Wales–Queensland and the New South Wales–South Australia borders. The New South Wales section of the Dingo Fence was originally built in 1921 with the purpose of preventing sheep predation by dingoes in Western New South Wales, it is estimated that without it sheep grazing would be uneconomical in the state west of Dubbo. Originally managed from Sydney, the management of the fence from the 1920s to the 1940s was considered ineffective, exacerbated by floods, droughts, inadequate funding and shortages of materials during the Second World War. The Wild Dog Destruction Board was founded in 1957 to rectify the management issues, it is headquartered in Broken Hill, a move that improved the organisation's responsiveness compared to its managerial predecessor based in far away Sydney.

The New South Wales section of the Dingo Fence runs , starting at Hungerford on the Queensland border and ends near Broken Hill on the South Australian border. The Wild Dog Destruction Board is staffed by 12–14 'doggers' who check the entire fence line twice a week, these staff being based in some of the most isolated regions of New South Wales.

References

1957 establishments in Australia
Government agencies established in 1957
Government agencies of New South Wales
Broken Hill, New South Wales
Feral dogs
Dog organizations